Parelius Hjalmar Bang Berntsen (24 February 1910 – 16 May 1995) was a Norwegian politician for the Labour Party.

He was born in Fauske.

He was elected to the Norwegian Parliament from Nordland in 1945, and was re-elected on four occasions.

Bang Berntsen was deputy mayor of Nord-Rana municipality during the period 1937–1941.

References

1910 births
1995 deaths
Labour Party (Norway) politicians
Members of the Storting
20th-century Norwegian politicians
People from Fauske